"Goodbye" is a song by British singer and songwriter Mimi Webb. It was released on 26 May 2022, through Epic Records. The song debuted at its peak of number 74 on the UK Singles Chart dated 3 June 2022.

Charts

References

2022 songs
2022 singles
Epic Records singles
Mimi Webb songs
Songs written by Mimi Webb
Songs written by Ross Golan